Strydom v Nederduitse Gereformeerde Gemeente Moreleta Park is a 2008 decision of the Transvaal Provincial Division of the High Court of South Africa in which the court held that it was unlawful for a church to fire a music teacher because of his sexual orientation. The plaintiff, Johan Strydom, was employed by the Moreleta Park congregation of the Dutch Reformed Church (NGK) until his contract was terminated because he was in a same-sex relationship. This was found to be unfair discrimination that was unlawful under the Promotion of Equality and Prevention of Unfair Discrimination Act. The church was ordered to pay R87,000 in damages and offer an unconditional apology. The decision was criticised by some religious and political groups who claimed that it infringed on freedom of religion.

References

External links
 Judgment

Transvaal Provincial Division cases
South African LGBT rights case law
South African labour case law
2008 in case law
2008 in South African law
2008 in LGBT history